María Paula Ortiz (born 16 April 1997) is an Argentine field hockey player and part of the Argentina national team.

Awards
 Young Player of the Tournament in 2017 Women's Pan American Cup.

References

External links
 

1997 births
Living people
Las Leonas players
Argentine female field hockey players
Female field hockey defenders
Female field hockey midfielders
Pan American Games medalists in field hockey
Pan American Games silver medalists for Argentina
Field hockey players at the 2015 Pan American Games
Medalists at the 2015 Pan American Games
20th-century Argentine women
21st-century Argentine women